Dennis Robert David Rogan, Baron Rogan (born 30 June 1942), is an Ulster Unionist Party (UUP) politician in Northern Ireland who served as president of the party from 2004 until 2006. He was previously chairman of the party.

He was created a life peer as Baron Rogan, of Lower Iveagh in the County of Down, on 16 July 1999 and is regarded as leader of the UUP in the Lords.

Lord Rogan is the son of Robert and Florence Rogan.

Lord Rogan is founder and managing director of Dennis Rogan & Associates – Carpet Yarn Brokers, founder and chairman of Associated Processors Ltd – Jute Processors, chairman of Stakeholder Communications Ltd, chairman of Events Management Ltd, and deputy chairman of Independent News & Media (NI) Ltd.

He is a member of the international advisory board of Independent News & Media, patron of The Somme Association and "Friend" of The Salvation Army. Lord Rogan was the honorary colonel of 40 (Ulster) Signals Regiment until its disbandment in 2010.

He has co-chaired the British-Taiwanese all-party parliamentary group.

Lord Rogan supported Britain's exit from the European Union.

He was granted arms on 9 September 2021.

See also
 List of Northern Ireland Members of the House of Lords

References

External links

 Profile at UK Parliament Website

1942 births
Living people
Ulster Unionist Party life peers
Crossbench life peers
People from County Down
Life peers created by Elizabeth II